Exact Audio Copy (EAC) is a CD ripping program for Microsoft Windows. The program has been developed by Andre Wiethoff since 1998. Wiethoff's motivation for creating the program was that other such software only performed jitter correction while scratched CDs often produce distortions.

Overview 
Exact Audio Copy is proprietary freeware, free for non-commercial use. It is written for Microsoft Windows. It has also been tested to work under newer versions of Wine on Linux.

EAC is used to convert the tracks on standard audio CDs to WAV files, which can then be transcoded into other formats. These include lossy ones such as MP3, AAC, Ogg Vorbis, or lossless ones such as ALAC, FLAC, or WavPack using external encoders. It also has the option of using the Windows Audio Compression Manager (ACM Codecs) for direct compression. It supports AccurateRip, which automatically compares the copy with rips made by others, and can automatically create cue sheets, with all gaps, track attributes, ISRC, and CD-Text included. EAC also supports automatic ID3 tagging using Internet-based databases such as freedb, GD3 (see below), or a local database.

If there are uncorrectable errors the software reports the error location.

EAC is popular among audiophiles for its accuracy and ability to rip slightly damaged audio compact discs.

A licensed version of Exact Audio Copy called Rockstar Custom Tracks was released by Rockstar Games in collaboration with Andre Wiethoff for use on the PlayStation Portable release of Grand Theft Auto: Liberty City Stories.

History 
The program was created by Andre Wiethoff in 1998, while he was a student at the University of Dortmund in Germany. Wiethoff stated that he became "fed up with other audio grabbers" that only do jitter correction while scratched CDs often produce distortions, and decided to develop his own.

In release 1.0b1, EAC supported the downloading of CD cover art, and in b2, an option was added to have the ID3 information, such as artist, CD title, track names, and cover art downloaded automatically from the GD3 database. Release 1.0b1 removed support for Windows 2000 and older versions of Windows.

Version 1.1 was released in 2015. Version 1.2, released in 2016, provided mainly bug fixes for the cdrdao component and updated the cover search in the freedb++ plugin. Version 1.3 was a hotfix released soon after version 1.2. Version 1.4 was released in 2020 with version 1.5 released soon after as a hotfix.

See also 
 Ripping

References

External links 
 

Windows-only freeware
Windows CD ripping software
1998 software